The slender-billed white-eye (Zosterops tenuirostris) is a species of bird in the family Zosteropidae. It is endemic to Norfolk Island.

Its natural habitat is subtropical or tropical moist lowland forest. It is threatened by habitat loss.

References

External links
BirdLife Species Factsheet.

Birds described in 1837
Endangered fauna of Australia
Endemic fauna of Australia
Birds of Norfolk Island
Zosterops
Taxonomy articles created by Polbot